Rushmore Media Company, Inc. is a small radio broadcasting company, which owns and operates four radio stations and one television station in the Black Hills region of western South Dakota. Its parent is Schurz Communications, a radio, television, cable television and newspaper media group.

The main offices and stations' studios are located at 660 Flormann St., Rapid City, South Dakota 57701. 

Rushmore Media Company's group consists of:

  KRCS FM 93.1  "Today's Hottest Music"
  KKMK FM 93.9  "93.9 The Mix, The Black Hills Best Mix."
  KOUT FM 98.7  "The Black Hills' Favorite Country"
  KFXS FM 100.3 "Classic Rock 100.3 The Fox"
  KHME channel 3 (ABC) (formerly KOTA-TV, "KOTA Territory")
 KDUH-TV channel 4 Scottsbluff, Nebraska (satellite of KHME)
 KQME channel 11 Lead, South Dakota (satellite of KHME)
 KSGW-TV channel 12 Sheridan, Wyoming (satellite of KHME)

Schurz Communications announced on September 14, 2015 that it would exit broadcasting and sell its television and radio stations, including the Rushmore Media Company stations, to Gray Television for $442.5 million. Gray subsequently announced on October 1 that it would sell the KOTA-TV license to Legacy Broadcasting for $1, a deal that also includes the license for satellite station KHSD-TV and the station's subchannel affiliations with MeTV and This TV; a month later, on November 2, Gray announced that HomeSlice Media Group would acquire the Rushmore Media Company radio stations for $2.2 million, reuniting them with KBHB and KKLS, which Schurz had sold to HomeSlice in 2014 as part of its acquisition of KOTA-TV. Following the completion of these sales, Gray will retain KOTA-TV's ABC affiliation and transfer it to its existing television station in Rapid City, KEVN-TV; it will also retain KOTA-TV satellite stations KDUH-TV and KSGW-TV and convert them to satellites of KNOP-TV in North Platte, Nebraska and KCWY-DT in Casper, Wyoming (both NBC affiliates), respectively.

References

Companies based in South Dakota
Mass media in South Dakota